SPEAR (originally Stanford Positron Electron Asymmetric Rings, now simply a name) was a collider at the SLAC National Accelerator Laboratory. During the 1970s, experiments at the accelerator played a key role in particle physics research, including the discovery of the  meson (awarded the 1976 Nobel Prize in physics), many charmonium states, and the discovery of the tau (awarded the 1995 Nobel Prize in physics).

Today, SPEAR is used as a synchrotron radiation source for the Stanford Synchrotron Radiation Lightsource (SSRL). The latest major upgrade of the ring in that finished in 2004 rendered it the current name SPEAR3.

References

External links 
 
 Brief explanation of the acronym in SLACspeak
 25th Anniversary Info from SLAC
 SPEAR3 status

Buildings and structures in San Mateo County, California
Particle physics facilities
Stanford University
Particle accelerators